Waterbury station is a commuter rail stop on the Waterbury Branch of the Metro-North Railroad's New Haven Line, located on Meadow Street in Waterbury, Connecticut. It is the northern terminus of the Waterbury Branch.

Following its completion on March 28, 2015, improved express bus service began between Waterbury station to Hartford via the CTfastrak busway, servicing the communities of Southington and Cheshire using this partially grade-separated route.

Station layout
The current station is a large platform near the old one, a 1909 brick edifice known for its distinctive clock tower and which is the focal point of Waterbury's skyline. The old station is now the offices of the Republican-American, Waterbury's daily newspaper. The modern station has one high-level side platform to the east of the tracks long enough for one and a half train cars to receive and discharge passengers. The platform has a roof that covers it. A Metro-North siding is located just south of the station. The siding was once track one, directly adjacent to the old station. A section of the track was removed, and the parking lot built in its place. There is also a small coach yard to the west of the station.

The station is owned and operated by the Connecticut Department of Transportation, but Metro-North is responsible for maintaining platform lighting as well as trash and snow removal. Parking is first-come, first-serve and operated by the city of Waterbury.

References

External links

Fix My Station Campaign - Waterbury
Connecticut Department of Transportation "Condition Inspection for the Waterbury Station" July 2002

Metro-North Railroad stations in Connecticut
Stations along New York, New Haven and Hartford Railroad lines
Buildings and structures in Waterbury, Connecticut
Railroad stations in New Haven County, Connecticut
Transportation in New Haven County, Connecticut